David Baillie is a writer and artist best known for creating the Vertigo comic series Red Thorn, and for writing stories for 2000 AD and Judge Dredd Megazine - for which he also once wrote a monthly column describing his life as a comics creator.

Biography
David Baillie was born in Whitburn, West Lothian in 1977. At university he studied electrical engineering, moved to London in 1999 and worked there for two years as a computer programmer in an investment bank before quitting that job to become an artist.

In 2010 Baillie was engaged as artist-in-residence for visual arts centre Firstsite in Colchester.

In 2011 he took part in the successful group effort to break the Guinness World Records for the fastest comic-book ever produced and the largest number of creators working on a single comic, with proceeds going to Yorkhill Hospital.

In 2013 he was one of a number of professional writers commissioned to write a novel for Amazon Publishing's Kindle Worlds line featuring the Valiant Comics character Bloodshot

In 2014 he was interviewed in Judge Dredd Megazine issue 344 by Matthew Badham about his comics career to date.

It was announced at San Diego ComicCon 2015 that Baillie would write a new series for Vertigo called Red Thorn, set in modern day Glasgow exploring Scottish mythology, featuring art by Meghan Hetrick, colours by Steve Oliff, (latterly Nick Filardi) and letters by Todd Klein.

In 2017 Baillie appeared at the Edinburgh International Book Festival with Rob Davis to discuss Comics of a Deadly Kind and the inspiration and publication history of his series Red Thorn.

At the beginning of 2018 it was announced that Baillie would write the return of classic Judge Dredd character Chopper with Mad Max's Brendan McCarthy on art.

In 2018 Baillie was interviewed for the Scotland's Futures Forum film Our Future Scotland, along with Scottish writers, artists, politicians and actors, including Brian Cox, Nicola Sturgeon and Christopher Brookmyre.

In 2019 Baillie's Chopper stories were collected by Rebellion and he wrote a graphic novel celebrating the thrash metal band Megadeth's greatest hits international tour.

In 2020 Baillie revisited the history of classic 2000AD character The Gronk, produced several Judge Dredd tales with new Scottish artist Anna Morozova and contributed a number of short stories to Rebellion's Judge Dredd Prose collection, Judge Fear’s Big Day Out and Other Stories. In May he and Conor Boyle created a story called “Revenge of the Cicatrix” for Heavy Metal Magazine. He also wrote and drew a short web series of unconnected comic stories for Webtoon called Paraverse.

Selected bibliography

Vertigo / DC Comics
Red Thorn, ongoing series, with art by Meghan Hetrick, letters by Todd Klein (2015)
"Night of the Black Stant" in Vertigo CMYK K, with art by Will Morris, letters by Todd Klein (2015)

2000 AD
 "The Ghostship Mathematica" with art by Inaki Miranda/Eva de la Cruz,  (Progs 1827 to 1829)
 "After the Vengeance" with art by Jon Davis-Hunt, (Progs 1870 to 1873)
 "The Flowers of Viber Hinge" with art by Paul Marshall, Prog 1873
 "A Guide for Prisoners Arriving from the Year 2149"  with art by Warren Pleece, (Prog 1786)
 "Silent Running", with art by Anthony Williams (comics), (Prog 1787)
 "Birth of the Mazzikim", with art by Jesus Redondo, (Prog 1737)
 "The Death Magnetic", with art by Will Morris, (Prog 1836)
 "Time is the Only Enemy, art by Graeme Neil Reid and Letters by Simon Bowland, (Prog 1837)
 "The Crow Gifts", art by Joshua George, Letters by Ellie De Ville,  (Prog 1958)

Judge Dredd Megazine
 "The Unfortunate Case of High-Altitude Albert", with art by Joel Carpenter, (Meg 317)
 "And Death Must Die", with art by Jake Lynch, (Meg 348)
 "Dead Man Talking", Judge Dredd prose story, (Meg 339)
 "Too Hottie To Handle", Judge Dredd prose story, (Meg 354)
 "Prophet of Stomm", Judge Dredd Black Museum art by Steve Austin, (Meg 357)
 Chopper: "Wandering Soul", with art by Brendan McCarthy, (Meg 395-399)

References

External links

Profile at 2000AD online

Year of birth missing (living people)
Living people
British comics writers
People from West Lothian
DC Comics people
Scottish comics writers
Scottish science fiction writers